Human Dignity Trust is a UK-based organisation that focuses on strategic litigation challenging the criminalisation of homosexuality around the world. It was founded in 2011 by Jonathan Cooper and Tim Otty QC. Cooper led the organisation until 2016, and as of 2022 it is led by Téa Braun.

References

External links 

 Official website

LGBT rights organizations
Human rights organisations based in the United Kingdom
2011 establishments in the United Kingdom
Charities based in England and Wales